The Orsis T-5000 is a Russian bolt-action sniper rifle. It was the first product developed by ORSIS, and is produced in their Moscow factory.  The rifle was introduced in 2011 at the international exhibition of Russian weapons in Nizhny Tagil, and is entirely original, using no third-party components. According to General Director of the Institute for Precision Machine Engineering TsNIITochMash, Dmitry Semiozerov: "As of 2017, the newest sniper complex T-5000 "Precision" was adopted by the FSB, the FSO, and Rosgvardiya".

Design
In its standard configuration the T-5000 is equipped with a 660 mm fluted, stainless steel barrel (698 mm when chambered in .338 Lapua Magnum), cut to a twist rate between 1-in-10 and 1-in-12 depending on customer requirements.

The stainless steel stock adopts a highly "skeletal" design, with highly adjustable butt and cheekpiece components mounted on a folding stock that reduces the transport length of the T-5000 by around 250 mm. The trigger is adjustable from 500 g in its Varmint configuration, to over 1500 g depending on application, and a Picatinny rail is provided for the attachment of optics.

Variants
The Federal Security Service, the Federal Protective Service and the National Guard in 2017 adopted a next-gen Orsis T-5000, and designated it as the Tochnost ("precision") sniper rifle chambered in 7.62×51mm NATO and .338 Lapua Magnum (8.6×70mm).

A next-gen T-5000 'Tochnost' sniper rifle chambered in .375 CheyTac (9.5×77mm) and made for rough military conditions was tested in the Moscow Region. The tests were successfully completed in 2019.

Users

  - In 2020 Nagorno-Karabakh War it was also seen in hand of Azerbaijani special forces.
  – Ministry of Defense, Presidential Guard 
 – Used by People's Liberation Army and SWAT units.
  – Used By Unit 777 and Thunderbolt Forces 
  – Used by Iraqi Special Operations Forces and Popular Mobilisation Forces
  – In particular used by certain FSB, the FSO, and Rosgvardiya units.

References

Sources

External links

 

7.62×51mm NATO rifles
.338 firearms
Bolt-action rifles of Russia
Sniper rifles of Russia